The  is a class of Bo-Bo-Bo wheel arrangement diesel-electric locomotives operated by Japanese National Railways (JNR) in Japan from 1957 until 1983.

Variants

DF50-0
The first batch of 65 locomotives was built between 1957 and 1962 with Sulzer 8-cylinder 8LDA25A 1,060 hp diesel engines. Production was shared between Kisha Seizō, Mitsubishi, and Nippon Sharyō.

DF50-500
A later batch of 73 locomotives was built between 1958 and 1963 with MAN V6-cylinder V22/30 1,200 hp diesel engines. Production was shared between Hitachi, Kawasaki, and Toshiba.

Operations

Class DF50 locomotives were intended for use on both passenger and freight services, and included a steam generator for train heating. They operated on the following lines, including use hauling "Blue Train" sleeping car services.
 Hokuriku Main Line
 Sanin Main Line
 Dosan Line (Shikoku)
 Kisei Line
 Nippo Line (Kyushu)

In later years, operations were restricted to Kyushu and Shikoku, with the remaining locomotives withdrawn in 1983, except for DF50 1, which later passed into JR Shikoku ownership.

Livery
The locomotives were initially painted in all-over maroon with stainless steel bands, but were subsequently repainted into the standard JNR diesel locomotive livery of vermillion and grey.

Preserved examples
Three Class DF50 locomotives were preserved.
 DF50 1: Preserved at The Railway History Park in Saijo, Ehime
 DF50 4: Preserved in a park in Osaka
 DF50 18: Formerly preserved at the Modern Transportation Museum, Osaka, but moved to the Tsuyama Railroad Educational Museum in Tsuyama, Okayama in March 2015

Classification

The DF50 classification for this locomotive type is explained below.
 D: Diesel locomotive
 F: Six driving axles
 50: Locomotive with maximum speed exceeding 85 km/h

References

Diesel-electric locomotives of Japan
Hitachi locomotives
Kawasaki diesel locomotives
Kisha Seizo locomotives
Toshiba locomotives
Bo-Bo-Bo locomotives
1067 mm gauge locomotives of Japan
Railway locomotives introduced in 1957
Nippon Sharyo locomotives